Volker Strübing (born 22 April 1971 in Sondershausen, Thuringia) is a German book author and songwriter.

Work 

Since 2004 he performs regularly at poetry slams as solo act or as part of Team LSD (ca-performing with Michael Ebeling).

His main focus are short satirical texts written expressly for being read to an audience.

Awards 

In October 2005 he was awarded the Slam2005 in Leipzig, which certifies him slam mastery on national the scale. His Das Paradies am Rande der Stadt reached second place at  Deutscher Science Fiction Preis 2006 in the competition for best novel.

In November 2006 Michael Ebeling and Volker Strübing were awarded the Slam2006 best team award as Team LSD in Munich. In 2008, Volker Strübing gained 3rd place in the final round for Stuttgarter Besen, an award specifically for next generation cabaret artists.

References

External links 

 
 Volker Strübing

1971 births
Living people
People from Sondershausen
German humorists
German poets
German cabaret performers
German male poets